Willoughby Hills is a city in Lake County, Ohio, United States. The population was 9,485 at the 2010 census.  A suburb of Cleveland, it is part of the Greater Cleveland Metropolitan Area.

Geography
Willoughby Hills is located at  (41.588151, -81.442475).

Willoughby Hills borders Euclid and Richmond Heights on the west, Gates Mills, Highland Heights, and Mayfield Village on the south, Kirtland and Waite Hill on the east, and Wickliffe and Willoughby to the north.

Demographics

88.3% spoke English, 3.7% Slovene, 3.1% Croatian, 1.1% Spanish, 1.1% Italian, and 1.1% Russian.

Of the city's population over the age of 25, 35.5% held a bachelor's degree or higher.

2010 census
As of the census of 2010, there were 9,485 people, 4,398 households, and 2,602 families living in the city. The racial makeup of the city was 77.6% White, 16.1% African American, 4.3% Asian, 0.3% from other races, and 1.6% from two or more races. Hispanic or Latino of any race were 1.3% of the population.

There were 4,398 households, of which 23.0% had children under the age of 18 living with them, 44.6% were married couples living together, 10.4% had a female householder with no husband present, 4.1% had a male householder with no wife present, and 40.8% were non-families. 35.6% of all households were made up of individuals, and 10.8% had someone living alone who was 65 years of age or older. The average household size was 2.16 and the average family size was 2.80.

The median age in the city was 44.4 years. 18.6% of residents were under the age of 18; 8.2% were between the ages of 18 and 24; 24% were from 25 to 44; 31.1% were from 45 to 64; and 18.1% were 65 years of age or older. The gender makeup of the city was 48.1% male and 51.9% female.

2000 census
As of the census of 2000, there were 8,595 people, 3,973 households, and 2,379 families living in the city. The population density was 798.4 people per square mile (308.4/km). There were 4,292 housing units at an average density of 398.7 per square mile (154.0/km). The racial makeup of the city was 88.84% White, 6.47% African American, 0.07% Native American, 3.55% Asian, 0.15% from other races, and 0.92% from two or more races. Hispanic or Latino of any race were 0.70% of the population. 15.5% were of German, 15.3% Italian, 11.1% Slovene, 8.8% Irish and 7.3% English ancestry according to Census 2000.

There were 3,973 households, out of which 20.9% had children under the age of 18 living with them, 49.2% were married couples living together, 7.4% had a female householder with no husband present, and 40.1% were non-families. 35.1% of all households were made up of individuals, and 11.5% had someone living alone who was 65 years of age or older. The average household size was 2.16 and the average family size was 2.82.

In the city the population was spread out, with 18.1% under the age of 18, 7.1% from 18 to 24, 28.4% from 25 to 44, 27.9% from 45 to 64, and 18.4% who were 65 years of age or older. The median age was 43 years. For every 100 females, there were 91.5 males. For every 100 females age 18 and over, there were 90.0 males.

The median income for a household in the city was $47,493, and the median income for a family was $60,397. Males had a median income of $47,190 versus $30,908 for females. The per capita income for the city was $26,688. About 1.7% of families and 3.4% of the population were below the poverty line, including 2.7% of those under age 18 and 2.7% of those age 65 or over.

Education
The city is served by the Willoughby-Eastlake City School District.

Willoughby Hills has a public library, a branch of Willoughby-Eastlake Public Library.

Places of interest
Two notable buildings in Willoughby Hills are the Squire's Castle in the Cleveland Metroparks' North Chagrin Reservation and the Louis Penfield House, a house designed by Frank Lloyd Wright.

References

External links
 

Cities in Lake County, Ohio
Populated places established in 1815
1815 establishments in Ohio
Cleveland metropolitan area
Cities in Ohio